Nathan Fien (born 1 August 1979), also known by the nickname of "Fieny", is a former New Zealand international rugby league footballer who played as a  and  in the 2000s and 2010s.

He last played for the St. George Illawarra Dragons in the National Rugby League.

He was a member of the 2008 World Cup winning New Zealand team and a member of the 2010 NRL (National Rugby League) Premiership winning St. George Illawarra Dragons. Fien played in all four of the Kiwi's 2010 Four Nations internationals at halfback, including scoring the match winning try in the 79th minute of the final. Fien's impressive late season form saw him winning the halfback spot in Rugby League World's 2010 team of the year.

Background
Fien was born in Mount Isa, Queensland, Australia.

North Queensland
Fien was educated at Blackheath and Thornburgh College, Charters Towers and played his junior rugby league for Brothers in Mount Isa. In 2000 he made his debut with the North Queensland Cowboys, playing against the Penrith Panthers. In 2001 his form warranted selection to the Queensland side, where he came off the bench for one State of Origin match.  In the 2004 NRL season, Fien played 23 games for North Queensland as the club reached the finals for the first time in their history.  They would defeat eventual premiers Canterbury in week one of the finals and go on to reach the preliminary final against the Sydney Roosters before losing 16-19 at Telstra Stadium.

New Zealand Warriors
After playing 93 games for North Queensland, Fien signed with the New Zealand Warriors from the season 2005 onwards. He later extended his contract until the end of 2009.

In 2008 he was told that he would not be required past the 2009 season at the Warriors and that they would consider releasing him at the end of the 2008 season. Fien initially turned down this offer, hoping that his form in the World Cup could earn him a contract extension. However, after the Huddersfield Giants failed to gain a work visa for Todd Carney they approached Fien with a large offer. In January 2009 Fien requested that the Warriors release him from his final season. This request was initially turned down by the Warriors due to the earlier release of Grant Rovelli, however on 30 June 2009 it was announced that Fien would transfer to the St. George Illawarra Dragons for the remainder of the season.

St. George Illawarra
In May 2009, after being dropped from first grade by the Warriors, Fien announced he has signed a three-year deal with the St. George Illawarra Dragons from 2010. On 30 June the Warriors agreed to release Fien from the rest of his contract, and he joined the Dragons for the second half of the 2009 season.

In the opening round of 2010 he suffered a serious ankle injury which kept him out until just before the finals. Upon his return he provided attacking options to the team and proved an invaluable player throughout the end of the regular season and finals. He was in the 2010 premiership winning St. George Illawarra team and scored the final try of the 2010 NRL Grand Final, showcasing his dummy half skills. He was re-signed until the end of 2013.

He retired at the end of the 2013 season.

International career
Born in Australia, Fien claimed eligibility to play for New Zealand through a New Zealand-born grandmother, and played in two 2006 Tri-Nations matches. After these appearances it emerged that his New Zealand born relation was, in fact, a great-grandmother. Following this discovery the International Rugby League Board declared him ineligible to play for the Kiwis, and New Zealand was stripped of its 2 championship points they got from beating Great Britain. The issue was dubbed Grannygate by the media.

In August 2008, Fien was named in the New Zealand training squad for the 2008 Rugby League World Cup - now being eligible for New Zealand due to residency qualifications via his tenure at the Auckland-based Warriors - and in October 2008 he was named in the final 24-man Kiwi squad. Fien played at halfback in the World Cup final, which was won by New Zealand.

He retired from international rugby league following the 2012 ANZAC Test.

References

External links

2011 St. George Illawarra Dragons profile

1979 births
Living people
Auckland rugby league team players
Australian people of New Zealand descent
Australian rugby league players
New Zealand national rugby league team players
New Zealand Warriors players
North Queensland Cowboys players
NRL All Stars players
Queensland Rugby League State of Origin players
Rugby league five-eighths
Rugby league halfbacks
Rugby league hookers
Rugby league players from Mount Isa
Sportsmen from Queensland
St. George Illawarra Dragons players